Huangpu, also formerly romanized Whangpoo or Whang-Po, may refer to:

 Huangpu District, Shanghai, China
 Huangpu River, in Shanghai, China
 Huangpu District, Guangzhou, Guangdong, China
 Huangpu Military Academy, in Guangzhou, China
 Pazhou Island, formerly known as Whampoa or Huangpu, now in Haizhu District, Guangzhou, China
 Huangpu, Zhongshan, a town in Zhongshan, Guangdong, China
 Huangpu Road Station, a station on Line 1 in Wuhan, Hubei, China

See also
 Whampoa (disambiguation), another former romanization of the same Chinese name
 Huangfu, a Chinese surname